Rudolf Faluvégi (born 9 January 1994) is a Hungarian handball player who plays for HSC Suhr Aarau and the Hungarian national team.

His sister, Dorottya Faluvégi is also a professional handball player.

Honours

Individual
 Hungarian Adolescent Handballer of the Year: 2010
 Hungarian Youth Handballer of the Year: 2013

References

External links
Oregfiuk.hu
Cskk.hu

1994 births
Living people
Hungarian male handball players
Handball players from Budapest